Wawrzyniec Bazarnik (13 July 1927 – 5 February 1977) was a Polish boxer. He competed in the men's bantamweight event at the 1948 Summer Olympics.

References

1927 births
1977 deaths
Polish male boxers
Olympic boxers of Poland
Boxers at the 1948 Summer Olympics
Sportspeople from Chorzów
Bantamweight boxers